The Catholic Church in Malaysia is part of the worldwide Catholic Church, under the spiritual leadership of the Pope in Rome. The Apostolic Nuncio to Malaysia currently is Archbishop Wojciech Załuski, who was appointed on the 22 September 2020; The resident ambassador of Malaysia to the Holy See is Westmoreland Anak Edward Palon.

The first Catholic priests landed in Malacca in 1511 as military chaplains to the Portuguese. The missionaries were Franciscan  and Dominican friars. Malacca new role became a stop-over for the thousands of missionaries who spread the faith to South and Far East Asia. Till today, small Christian communities are found in these places due to its missionary zest. Malacca holds a special place in the history of the Church in this region.

First wave of evangelisation

From the 7th to the 14th century, numerous small kingdoms which were strongly Hindu, existed at river mouths. The Sri Vijaya Empire extended its great influence to the region. In 1403, a prince from Sumatra, Parameswara, founded Malacca. He later converted to Islam and took the name of Sri Maharaja Mohammed Shah.

The year 1511 was marked with the arrival of Portuguese led by Admiral Afonso de Albuquerque and the first catholic chaplains. The Portuguese captured Malacca for its well-known spice trade. Between 1545 and 1552, St Francis Xavier preached in Malacca. By 1557, Malacca was raised to a suffragan see (deputy diocese). In 1641, the occupation of Malacca by the Dutch began and the authorities in power suppressed Catholicism. The bishops and priests fled to Timor.

Second wave of evangelisation

In 1786, Sir Francis Light took over Penang from the Sultan of Kedah. Finally in 1809, the College General in Penang was opened again and seminarians from all over Asia came to be trained there. In 1819, Sir Stamford Raffles took residence in Singapore. In 1824, the Anglo-Dutch Treaty was signed and the Netherlands exchanged Malacca for Bencoolan, Indonesia. Later, in 1826, Penang, Province Wellesley, Malacca and Singapore became the Straits Settlement under British rule. In 1852, the Sisters of St Maur or the Infant Jesus sisters (IJ) and the Institute of the Brothers of the Christian Schools (La Salle Brothers) sailed over to found Christian schools in major towns in Peninsular Malaysia. The sisters also began orphanages. In 1864, Chinese tin miners settled at the confluence of the muddy Klang and Gombak river mouth, the beginning of Kuala Lumpur. In 1874, the Treaty of Pangkor marked the direct British rule over the Malay states, while the sultans still maintained religious sovereignty. By the end 19th century, Malaysia was booming with massive immigration of Chinese and Indians who were invited to work in the tin mines, rubber plantation and railways by the British.

Catholicism first came to North Borneo when a Spanish mariner turned priest, Carlos Cuarteroni established a Catholic mission in 1857 in Labuan, with stations established in Brunei and Looc Porin (now Kota Kinabalu). However, problems with his assistants left him alone from 1860 and the mission made little progress, and he returned to Spain. The Catholic Mill Hill Missionaries arrived in North Borneo in 1882 to re-establish the Spaniards effort, and focused mainly on the Chinese and indigenous communities, such as the Kadazan-Dusun people.

Meanwhile, in Sarawak, the Mill Hill Missionaries was invited by the White Rajahs in the hope that it would be a stabilizing influence to the native Iban people.

Second World War and the Emergency (1940-1975)

During the years 1942-1945 of the Second World War and the Japanese occupation, schools were closed; and the people suffered a lot. In the years 1948–1960, the Communist insurrection was very hostile to the Catholic Church. On 1 February 1948, the Federation of Malaya Government was formed. In 1955, the two dioceses of Kuala Lumpur and Penang were created and the consecration of first local bishops Dominic Vendargon and Francis Chan took place. In 1957, on 31 August, Malaya gained independence, and the first Prime Minister Tunku Abdul Rahman was appointed. In 1962, Pope John XXIII called for the renewal of the Church and opened the Second Vatican Council. On 16 September 1963, a big country uniting Malaysia with Singapore, Sabah and Sarawak was created but by 1965, Singapore broke up with Malaysia and became an independent republic. On 13 May 1969, racial violence and killings were recorded in the aftermath of the elections. A state of emergency was declared and a curfew imposed. In 1970, the New Economic Policy was introduced with quota systems. Over the decade, Christians were discriminated against and Catholic and other Christian missionaries were expelled from Sabah. However, in 1972, the new diocese of Malacca-Johor was created, making a total of six in Malaysia (three in the West, and three in Eastern Malaysia). In 1973, Malaysia became the first ASEAN country to recognise China. From 1970 to 1975 the resurgence of communist activities in the north and in urban centres created more political mayhem and led to persecutions against the Christians. In 1974, the first permanent deacon from Malaysia  was ordained. Between 1975 and 1980, Vietnamese refugees (boat people) arrived in throngs and put a new stress on the country. In 1976, a month-long Aggiornamento (in Penang) for Bishops and priests of West Malaysia was held. A vision for the Peninsular Malaysia Church was formulated.

The consolidation of the Catholic faith (1977-2001)
Parallel to the economical and industrial development of the nation, the Catholic Church in Malaysia grew considerably during these years, emphasising on inter-religious dialogue, oecumenism and religious freedom.

In 1977, the first Catholic Charismatic Convention was organised in Ipoh. In 1979, the Asian Bishop's Institute for Social Action met in Kuala Lumpur for dialogue on religions.  In 1981, a new gathering of all priests from West Malaysia to review the Aggiornamento of 1976 was organised. In 1983, the Malaysian Consultative Council on Buddhism, Christianity, Hinduism, Sikhism (MCCBCHS) for dialogue was formed to represent their interests with the authorities.  In the same way and with a spirit of oecumenism, the Christian Federation of Malaysia consisting of the Catholic, Protestant and Evangelical churches was formed in 1984. In 1986, the Peninsular Malaysia Pastoral Convention (PMPC I) included Ministry to Youth as part of the core needs, besides poor, inter-religious dialogue, unity, formation and community building. In 1989, Sarawak made huge efforts in a successful attempt of renewal with a Eucharistic Congress, a  Bible Year and a Bible Congress.

In 1995, Churches in Sarawak requested the state to allow other faith education in schools besides Islam. In 1996, PMPA II gathered reviews and reaffirmed Aggiornamento 1976 and PMPC 1986. There was a renewed call for systematic and strategic planning and implementation. In 1998, the Deputy Prime Minister was arrested and the Reformasi movement started. In 1999, the Great Jubilee Year of redemption was declared open by Pope John Paul II. The first joint Community Spirituality retreat among Bishops, priests, religious and laity was organised. In 2001, the First Peninsula Malaysia Young Catholic Leaders Forum or LEAD 2001 was organised. PMPA III was held at Kuala Lumpur re-emphasised BECs.

Holy See relations
See: Holy See – Malaysia relations.

Diplomatic relations between Malaysia and the Holy See were initiated by Tun Dr Mahathir Mohammad when he met Pope John Paul II before his (Tun Mahathir) resignation. The negotiations continued on until Najib Razak became the Prime Minister. Malaysia established formal diplomatic relations with the Holy See in 2011 during a meeting between Prime Minister Datuk Seri Najib Razak and Pope Benedict XVI in Rome. Najib was accompanied by the Archbishop of Kuala Lumpur, Murphy Nicholas Xavier Pakiam. Archbishop Pakiam went to Vatican not as part of Malaysian Government, but was asked by Vatican to join the delegation as Church representative.

The first resident ambassador of Malaysia to the Holy See, Tan Sri Bernard Giluk Dompok, was elected in October 2015 by Pope Francis. 2017 marked the opening of the official chancery of the Holy See in Kuala Lumpur, Malaysia. Following the change of government from Barisan Nasional to Pakatan Harapan after the 14th General Election, Bernard Giluk Dompok was terminated of his service on 30 June 2018.

Westmoreland Edward Palon, who was named by Wisma Putra as second Malaysia's ambassador to the Vatican on 21 March is a Bidayuh who hails from Kampung Duras, Kuching.

The Apostolic Nunciature in Malaysia was established on the 27 July 2011 through an official act of the Holy See "Acta Apostolicae Sedis". The current Nuncio is Archbishop Wojciech Zaluski.

Today

As of 2010, there were 1,007,643 Catholics in Malaysia - approximately 3.56% of the total population.  The country is divided into nine dioceses including three archdioceses:
 Archdiocese of Kuala Lumpur
Diocese of Malacca Johore
 Diocese of Penang
 Archdiocese of Kuching
 Diocese of Miri
 Diocese of Sibu
 Archdiocese of Kota Kinabalu
 Diocese of Keningau
 Diocese of Sandakan

Catholic publications
The Catholic Church in Malaysia has its own weekly newspaper, The Herald, distributed to all Catholic churches throughout Malaysia. Sabah and Sarawak also have their own local newspapers, such as Catholic Sabah (fortnightly), and Today's Catholic (monthly).

Notable people
 Anthony Soter Fernandez †-  Malaysia's first Roman Catholic cardinal, elevated on 19 November 2016. 
Tan Sri Datuk Seri Panglima Bernard Giluk Dompok - the first Ambassador of Malaysia to the Holy See (Vatican City). 
 Dato' Hans Isaac - Actor, producer, director and former model.
 Kasthuriraani Patto - politician and former Member of Parliament (MP) for Batu Kawan.
 Dato Pandelela Rinong Pamg - national diver and a two-time Olympic medalist. 
 Yang Amat Berbahagia Tun Datuk Seri Panglima Richard Malanjum - the 9th Chief Justice of Malaysia.
Teresa Kok - former Member of Parliament for Seputeh and former Minister for Primary Industry.
 Dato Westmoreland anak Edward Palon - the second Ambassador of Malaysia to the Holy See (Vatican City).

See also
 Christianity in Asia
 Christianity in Malaysia
 Religion in Malaysia
 Freedom of religion in Malaysia

References

External links
 Website of the Archdiocese of Kuala Lumpur
 Malaysian Catholic Christians Facebook group
 Malaysia Herald Catholic Newspaper
 Catholic Hierarchy for Malaysia

Further reading
 Khabar Gembira: History of the Catholic Church in East Malaysia and Brunei, 1880-1976 by John Rooney
 The Journey of the Catholic Church in Malaysia, 1511-1996 by Maureen K. C Chew
 The Founding of the Roman Catholic Church in Melanesia and Micronesia, 1850-1875 (Princeton Theological Monograph) by Ralph M. Wiltgen
 "The Roman Catholic Church" in Robert Hunt, Lee Kam Hing and John Roxborogh, Christianity in Malaysia: A Denominational History, Pelanduk, 1992, 1-33

 
Catholic Church by country
Catholic Church in Asia